Shegunashi is a village in the southern state of Karnataka, India. It is located in the Athani taluk of Belagavi district in Karnataka.

Demographics
 India census, Shegunashi had a population of 5793 with 2959 males and 2834 females.

Transportation
Shegunasi has NWKRTC  bus service. The nearest railway station is Kudachi railway station, which is 14 km from the city. Belagavi and Kolhapur are the nearest airports. 

There is a proposal for a new railway line between Bagalkot–Kudachi-Terdal to connect Bagalkot with Belagavi & Miraj. A survey of this 105.0 km new railway line has been completed and submitted to South Western Railway Hubballi.

Educational institutions
 Shree Murughendra Swamiji (SMS) High School
 Government Kannada Boys Primary School
 Government Kannada Boys High School

See also
 Athani
 Belagavi
 Districts of Karnataka

References

External links
 http://Belagavi.nic.in/

Villages in Belagavi district